Cozi Central is a free Software as a service Web 2.0-based web application targeted at families offered by Cozi. It includes a family calendar, shopping list management, a screen saver with integrated appointment reminders, and Cozi Messages, which allows family members to quickly exchange text messages and email. It became available on September 25, 2006.

Features 
Cozi Central includes a color-coded calendar which helps family members coordinate schedules.  The design assumes that one OR two adults are running the household, and has a "hand off this appointment" feature.  Upcoming appointments appear on the integrated photo screen saver.

The shopping list feature lets family members access their shopping lists from mobile phones by sending a text message with the word "shopping" to BCOZI or 22694 (US only), or by calling an IVR system at 1-888-808-COZI.

Cozi Messages allows families to quickly send a short message by either text message or email, or both, to all family members.

On April 4, 2007, Cozi released a public beta of a toolbar that synchronizes the Cozi calendar with Microsoft Outlook.

Compatibility 
Cozi Central runs as both a PC application and a Web site.  The PC application requires Windows XP SP2 or Windows Vista.  The Web Access version requires Microsoft Internet Explorer 6 or Mozilla Firefox 1.0+.

See also

 Google Calendar
 Yahoo! Calendar

References

External links

Cozi Central Design Principles

Calendaring software